Perfect Strangers is a 2018 Mexican comedy film directed by Manolo Caro. It is an adaptation of the 2016 Italian film. The film premiered on 25 December 2018, and stars Bruno Bichir, Mariana Treviño, and Cecilia Suárez. The plot revolves around seven friends who gather for dinner and agree to participate in a game where they will have to read all the messages on their cell phones. Giving rise to a series of discussions and misunderstandings knowing all unexpected truths.

Plot summary

Cast 
 Bruno Bichir as Alonso
 Mariana Treviño as Flora
 Cecilia Suárez as Eva
 Manuel Garcia-Rulfo as Mario
 Ana Claudia Talancón as Ana
 Miguel Rodarte as Ernesto
 Franky Martín as Pepe

Production 
In November 2017 Cinépolis showed the Spanish version of Álex de la Iglesia to the Manolo Caro production team to propose the project of a Mexican version. Caro immediately accepted being his first remake and the first production of Cinépolis.

References

External links 
 
 

Mexican comedy films
Remakes of Italian films
2018 comedy films
2010s Mexican films